Khulna Zilla School is the oldest high school in the Khulna district of Bangladesh. It was established in 1885. It provides education from class three (Grade-3) to class ten (Grade-10).

The school has 50 faculty members and about 3000 students. The faculty members are graduates from universities in Bangladesh. Student applicants, mostly from top elementary schools, are put through a competitive admission selection process.

Admission 
Students are admitted into class three. After an initial screening, more than 1000 applicants appear at a comprehensive admission test for only 240 positions. Only a few meritorious students can get admitted in class 6 and 9.

Academics 
This school teaches from class three to class ten. Upon a screening in class ten, students appear at the SSC examination. In class five, the students appear at PEC. In class eight they appear at the JSC examination. The performance of the students of the school is always very fantastic. They always become 1st or 2nd in ranking in the Jessore Board. The students take part in different competitions like BDMO, science olympiad, physics olympiad. They also become successful in many of them. The teachers of this school are very able to teach their students with many examples. The students are also very conscious about their studies.

Building and grounds 
There are five buildings in this school. There is a very big playground in front of the school buildings. In this ground many outdoor games are organized. Now, Khulna Zilla School has a basketball ground also.

Alumni
Farrukh Ahmad, poet
Major General Khan Firoz Ahmed

See also 
 Khulna
 List of Zilla Schools of Bangladesh
 List of educational institutions in Khulna
 Khulna Public College

References 

1885 establishments in India
High schools in Bangladesh
Buildings and structures in Khulna
Educational institutions established in 1885
Boys' schools in Bangladesh
Educational institutions of Khulna Division